Charles Ernest Rowston (1887 – 28 September 1946) was an English professional footballer who played as a winger.

References

1887 births
1946 deaths
Footballers from Grimsby
English footballers
Association football wingers
Cleethorpes Town F.C. players
Grimsby Town F.C. players
Grimsby Rovers F.C. players
Gainsborough Trinity F.C. players
English Football League players